Prince Alexander Ivanovich Gagarin (1801 – 27 October 1857) was a Russian general and nobleman of Rurikid ancestry who was involved in the Caucasian and Crimean wars. In 1857, he served as a governor-general of Kutaisi and was killed by Constantine Dadeshkeliani, the deposed Prince of Svanetia, during a quarrel at Kutaisi.

References 

 His biography at Hronos.Ru

1801 births
1857 deaths
Imperial Russian Army generals
Alexander
Russian military personnel of the Caucasian War
Russian military personnel of the Crimean War